Alison Hume  is a British television writer, known for her work as creator and executive producer of the CBBC series The Sparticle Mystery and the BBC drama Rocket Man.

Politics
In the 2019 European Parliament election Alison Hume stood as a candidate for the Labour Party in the Yorkshire and the Humber constituency. Hume was also a candidate in the 2021 election for the North Yorkshire Police, Fire and Crime Commissioner, she was unsuccessful in her bid and finished in second place.

Filmography

Awards and nominations

References

External links
 
 

British television writers
Showrunners
British science fiction writers
British women television writers
Living people
British fantasy writers
British crime writers
Year of birth missing (living people)
Women crime writers
Women science fiction and fantasy writers
British women television producers
Labour Party (UK) politicians